Frank Arah Day (September 30, 1855 – December 27, 1928) was a Minnesota legislator and the 13th Lieutenant Governor of Minnesota.

Life and career
Day was born in Attica, Wisconsin. He moved to Minnesota in 1874, settling in Fairmont, Minnesota. He was founder and publisher of the Martin County (later Fairmont) Sentinel newspaper, and later became involved in local Republican politics. He also served in both houses of the Minnesota State Legislature: he was elected to the Minnesota State House of Representatives in 1878 (the youngest serving member at the time) and to the Minnesota State Senate from 1886 to 1895. He became Lieutenant Governor under Governor from January 31, 1895 to January 5, 1897 after Knute Nelson was elected to the U.S. Senate and his lieutenant governor David Marston Clough replaced him. In the 1890s he became involved with the Silver Republican Party.

Day was re-elected to the Minnesota State Senate in 1926 as an independent. He died following a paralytic stroke while in office in 1928 in Winona, Minnesota. He is buried in Fairmont, Minnesota.

References

1855 births
1928 deaths
People from Green County, Wisconsin
Lieutenant Governors of Minnesota
Minnesota state senators
Members of the Minnesota House of Representatives
Minnesota Independents
Minnesota Republicans
People from Fairmont, Minnesota